Kuwait participated in the 1998 Asian Games held in Bangkok, Thailand from December 6, 1998 to December 20, 1998. Athletes from Kuwait succeeded in winning 4 golds, 6 silvers and 4 bronzes, making total 14 medals. Kuwait finished fourteenth in a medal table.

References

Nations at the 1998 Asian Games
1998
Asian Games